Kısır is a bulgur based salad found in Turkish cuisine. The main ingredients are finely ground bulgur, parsley, and tomato paste. Common additional ingredients include onion, garlic (in some regions), sour pomegranate molasses, olive oil and lemon juice, cucumber, cornichons and spices. It can be served with lettuce leaves. It has a reddish color due to tomato paste admixture. It is served at room temperature as either a side-dish or meze appetizer.

See also
 List of salads
 Eetch 
 Tabbouleh
 Turkish cold bulgur soup
 Mercimek köftesi

References

External links 
 A recipe
 Another recipe

Salads
Turkish words and phrases
Turkish cuisine
Bulgur dishes